Meijiang is a district of Meizhou City, Guangdong Province, China.

Administrative divisions
Subdistricts:
Jinshan
Jiangnan
Xijiao
Towns:
Changsha
Sanjiao
Chengbei

Ethno-linguistic make-up

Meijiang is noted for its large Hakka population.

References 

County-level divisions of Guangdong
Meizhou